Tirunelveli division is a revenue division in the Tirunelveli district of Tamil Nadu, India.

References 
 

Tirunelveli district